Mariam Kaba (born 9 August 1961) is a French-Guinean actress.

Biography
Kaba was born in Kankan, Guinea, the daughter of Mohamed Ba Kaba, a diplomat and the author of several books on Islam. She moved to France in the early 1980s. After receiving her baccalaureate, Kaba enrolled at École des nouveaux métiers de la communication largely at the behest of her father. She only attended the school for a year and spent the money her father sent her on acting lessons, studying under Isabelle Sadoyan.

Kaba's first stage role was as the wife of Toussaint Louverture, alongside Benjamin Jules-Rosette, director of the Théâtre noir in Paris. Soon thereafter, she landed a role in the TV series Marc and Sophie. In 1989, Kaba made her film debut in Périgord noir, directed by Nicolas Ribowski. She played Maina, a young woman who came to work in the Périgord region. In 1992, she starred in her first African film, Blanc d'ébène. A World War II epic directed by Cheik Doukouré, she played a nurse engaged to the teacher Lancéi Kanté. Later in the year, Kaba appeared in Idrissa Ouedraogo's Samba Traoré. She collaborated with Doukouré again in 1994, in Le Ballon d'or. 

Her son was born in 1999. In 2000, Kaba played Pauline Lumumba, wife of the politician Patrice Lumumba, in Raoul Peck's Lumumba. Kaba had known his son, Roland, in her youth but did not want to meet Pauline in advance of the role. She fought for the role because she was interested in the history.

Kaba has appeared in more than 15 French TV shows and TV films, such as Navarro, Villa mon rêve, l'Avocate, Quatre cent suspects and Justice de femmes. Her most controversial performance was in the 2002 TV films Fatou la Malienne and Fatou l'Espoir, directed by Daniel Vigne. Kaba played the mother of Fatou, forcing her into an unwilling marriage. It sparked outcry in Mali and led to her being heckled on the street. Kaba explains that she read the script before meeting the real Fatou, and would never allow her husband to do a similar thing to her daughter.

Partial filmography
1989 : Périgord noir as Maina
1989 : Vanille Fraise as the first wife of Hippolyte
1992 : Blanc d'ébène as Saly
1992 : Samba Traoré as Saratou
1994 : Le Ballon d'or as Fanta
1995 : Pullman paradis as Jeja Sembene
1997 : Saraka bô as the wife of Marabout
1999 : Haut les cœurs! 
2000 : Lumumba as Pauline Lumumba
2001 : Quand on sera grand
2001 : Paris selon Moussa as Mame Traoré
2005 : Africa Paradis as the president of the National Assembly
2006 : Le Grand Appartement as the tenth wife of Oussamba
2009 : La Journée de la jupe as the mother of Mouss
2010 : Turk's Head as the African mother
2011 : Un Pas en avant as Gentivi
2011 : Polisse as the complaining woman at the police station
2014 : Valentin Valentin as the beautiful African
2016 : The Wedding Ring as the dethatcher
2017 : Il a déjà tes yeux as Madame Cissé
2018 : Vaurien as Salamata

References

External links
Mariam Kaba at the Internet Movie Database

1961 births
Living people
Guinean actors
French stage actresses
People from Kankan
French film actresses